The 1982 Wisconsin Badgers football team represented the University of Wisconsin–Madison in the 1982 Big Ten Conference football season. The Badgers won their first bowl game after going 0-4 in the previous four. The bowl game was the first live college football game televised by ESPN.

Schedule

Season summary

Ohio State

 
   

During the opening series, the Ohio State Buckeyes marched the length of the field to the Wisconsin 8 yard line only to watch freshman Rich Spangler miss a 25-yard field goal attempt.  Wisconsin responded by driving 80 yards in 14 plays for the only score of the game when Badger tailback John Williams ran the ball from the 1 yard line for the touchdown. Mark Doran's conversion attempt was blocked by Buckeye defensive tackle Jerome Foster.  Key plays in the scoring drive included the following: a 15-yard run by Chucky Davis, a 12-yard run by David Keeling, and three passes from quarterback Randy Wright to Tim Stracka, Jeff Nault, and Al Toon, the last pass covering 12 yards to the Ohio State 1.  Early in the second quarter, the Buckeyes moved the ball to the Wisconsin 33 only to have Spangler's 50 yard field goal attempt bounce off the crossbar.  The Badgers were offside on the play.  Spangler's second attempt of 45 yards then sailed wide to the left.  Midway through the third quarter, the Badger offense stalled on the Ohio State 13 where Doran missed a 30-yard field goal attempt.  The Buckeyes were unable to stop the Badger running backs during the final eight 8 minutes of the game resulting in a Badger shutout.

Minnesota

Roster

Team players in the 1983 NFL Draft

References

Wisconsin
Wisconsin Badgers football seasons
Independence Bowl champion seasons
Wisconsin Badgers football